Grazia Verzasconi (born 14 March 1962) is a Swiss rhythmic gymnast.

Verzasconi competed for Switzerland in the rhythmic gymnastics individual all-around competition at the 1984 Summer Olympics in Los Angeles. There she was 14th in the preliminary (qualification) round and advanced to the final of 20 competitors. In the end she finished in the 16th place overall.

References

External links 
 Grazia Verzasconi at Sports-Reference.com
 Videos at RSI Radiotelevisione svizzera
 Grazia Verzasconi e Los Angeles 1984
 Il mio giorno, Grazia Verzasconi (Sport Non Stop, 12.10.2014)

1962 births
Living people
Swiss rhythmic gymnasts
Gymnasts at the 1984 Summer Olympics
Olympic gymnasts of Switzerland